Aiden Shaw (born Aiden Brady, 22 February 1966) is an English author, model and former pornographic film actor.

Early life and modeling 
Aiden Brady was born on 22 February 1966 in Harrow, England. He graduated from the University of Brighton.

Shaw was signed to Success Models in Paris and Sight Management Studio in Barcelona. Shaw was photographed by Giampaolo Sgura for Hercules International magazine. In 2013, he was the face of Bytom, a Polish fashion company. In 2014, Shaw walked for Berluti. He was featured by New Zealand menswear brand Working Style for their Autumn Winter 2014 campaign. In 2016, Shaw reverted to his birth name as he continued to model for international brands like Massimo Dutti.

Pornography
Brady adopted the last name "Shaw" in the early 1990s when he began working in gay pornography and appeared in over 50 films. He retired from the porn industry in 1999, but in 2004, he starred in another gay porn film with Hot House.

Writing
In 1991, Shaw collaborated with the New York artist Mark Beard to produce a limited edition publication titled Aiden. The book included several portraits of Shaw, with text written by both Beard and Shaw as a form of dialogue.

Shaw published his first novel, Brutal, in 1996. Also in 1996, The Bad Press published a collection of his poems, If Language at the Same Time Shapes and Distorts our Ideas and Emotions, How do we Communicate Love? He wrote two more novels: Boundaries (1997) and Wasted (2001), and an autobiography, My Undoing (2006) in which he openly discusses his life in the sex industry as a porn star and sex worker, his drug use, and his HIV status (Shaw was diagnosed HIV positive in 1997).

Published works
 Brutal (Millivres Books, 1996) 
 If Language at the Same Time Shapes and Distorts Our Ideas and Emotions, How Do We Communicate Love? (The Bad Press, 1996) 
 Boundaries (Brighton: Millivres Prowler Group 1997) 
 Wasted (Brighton: Millivres Prowler Group, 2001) 
 My Undoing: Love in the Thick of Sex, Drugs, Pornography, and Prostitution (New York: Carroll & Graf, 2006) 
 Sordid Truths: Selling My Innocence for a Taste of Stardom (Alyson Books, 2009)

References

External links
 Sight Management – Aiden Brady (formerly Shaw)
 IMG Models – Aiden Shaw
 Why Not Models - Aiden Brady
 
 

1966 births
Living people
People with HIV/AIDS
20th-century English LGBT people
People from Harrow, London
English actors in gay pornographic films
Gay male prostitutes
English male models
English male pornographic film actors
English male prostitutes
English writers
Gay models
Male actors from London
21st-century English LGBT people